DS Techeetah was a Sino-French motor racing team under ownership of SECA - China Media Capital that competed in the electric racing series, Formula E.

Formula E
Team Aguri principal Aguri Suzuki announced he would leave the team in April 2016 as senior personnel entered "a period of consultation" over a future change in ownership. In the week before the 2016 London ePrix, the Chinese public equity and venture capital firm China Media Capital announced its purchase of Team Aguri and established a new entity named Techeetah in its place. Senior personnel from Team Aguri, including team principal Mark Preston, retained their jobs with Techeetah, and the cars ran a custom Renault powertrain.

2016–17 season

The team entered the sport following the acquisition of Team Aguri in 2016. In July 2016, Jean-Éric Vergne and Qinghua Ma (who competed with Team Aguri in the final rounds of the previous season prior to CMC's takeover) were confirmed as the team's drivers. With Renault providing powertrains for Techeetah's debut season, Vergne scored the team's maiden podium with a second place at the Buenos Aires ePrix. In March 2017, Techeetah announced former F1 driver Esteban Gutiérrez would replace Ma from round four onwards. However, after Gutiérrez left the team after only three races after being given an opportunity with Dale Coyne Racing to compete in the IndyCar Series, the team then signed Stéphane Sarrazin to compete with the team for the remainder of the season.

2017–18 season

Techeetah signed André Lotterer to partner Vergne for its second season in the series. Vergne was supremely consistent over the whole course of the season, finishing on points in every race, accumulating 198 points and winning the Drivers' Championship. The team got overtaken by Audi at the last second, missing out on Teams' Championship by only two points.

2018–19 season

In July 2018, Peugeot Sport with DS Automobiles-rebadged partnered with Techeetah and the team renamed to DS Techeetah. Techeetah switched powertrain from Renault to DS Automobiles powertrain, which also makes Techeetah a manufacturer team with its own DS E-TENSE. In October 2018, DS Techeetah introduced its new headquarters in Versailles. James Rossiter and Zhou Guanyu were announced as the development drivers for Techeetah the 2018/2019 season.

Techeetah's other line-up remained unchanged for the 2018–19 season. After the first race in New York City, Jean-Éric Vergne secured enough points to become the Drivers' Champion, winning his second Formula E championship. Techeetah won their first ever team championship in Formula E. Lotterer subsequently left the team, switching to Porsche.

2019–20 season
In September 2019, it was announced that António Félix da Costa would replace Lotterer in the team (as he had departed for the new Porsche Formula E Team). Vergne was set to continue with the team as he signed a long-term contract back in 2018.

2021-2022 

In the 2021-2022 season DS Techeetah was registered as a French team, though the ownership were still under SECA and China Media Capital.

Records 

DS Techeetah has earned various record results following the 2019/2020 season.

Team records 

 It's the first time a team get the most points on 5 consecutive races in a single season.
 It’s the first time that team has led with more than 64 points
 First team to score a 1-2 finish (Santiago 2018)
 Second team to score all possible points in one race (Audi Sport Abt Schaeffler did previously in Berlin 2018)
 Second team to win it twice
 Second team to win it twice in a row
 Only team to have two champions
 First team to score 48pts in a single race
 5 poles in a row
 Only team to have two 1-2 finishes / Santiago 18 (with Renault) and Berlin 20 (with DS)
 Only team to win both championships twice
 Only team to win both championships back to back
 Third team to do 3 consecutive wins for a team/manufacturer (shared with Audi and Renault)
 Only team to win Drivers and Teams championships before the last race (RD9 out of 11).
  Team with the largest lead to 2nd in the championship: 77 points
Season six saw the largest end of season gap in both Drivers (71 points) and Teams (77 points).

Driver records 
António Félix da Costa

 Is the only driver to win a race for three different Formula E teams.
 Is now the first driver to win the Formula E championship with two races remaining.
 Is the only driver to have won the championship with two races to go
 Is the driver with the largest lead to 2nd : 71 points
 3rd driver to do a hat-trick (Berlin RD 6 2020) shared with Sébastien Buemi and Daniel Abt
 3 consecutive pole positions in a single season
 3 consecutive wins (Season 6) shared with Sébastien Buemi
First driver to receive an Order of Merit as a result of winning a championship

About Antonio's 2019/2020 Formula E season

Wins: 4 (3 consecutive)

Podiums: 9 (7 consecutive)

Pole positions: 5 (consecutive)

Fastest in qualifying groups: 4

Lap lead: 174

Jean-Éric Vergne

 First back to back champion
 Only driver to win the championship twice 
 Only driver to have won the championship with one race to go

Jaguar I-Pace eTrophy
Techeetah became the first Formula E team to join the Jaguar I-Pace eTrophy support series, fielding one car for the inaugural 2018–19 season with Stefan Rzadzinski behind the wheel. The team competed under the name TWR Techeetah and was part of the Pro class. The eTrophy entry included an arrangement with Ryan Walkinshaw to return his late father Tom's TWR brand to international motorsport.

2018–19 season

A plain white livery was used during the first round in Ad Diriyah. Before the second round in Mexico City, a retro Silk Cut-based livery was introduced, which has been in use ever since. Rzadzinski's deal with the team came to end before the Berlin ePrix. Former Panasonic Jaguar Racing driver and 2008–09 A1GP champion Adam Carroll was announced as his replacement. The team, however, completely withdrew from the following round held in New York City.

The team's best result came at the Paris ePrix, where Rzadzinski finished second. For the majority of the season, the TWR Techeetah team was consistently behind the likes of Jaguar Brazil Racing and Rahal Letterman Lanigan Racing, whose drivers were regularly competing for wins. It was also the only team in the Pro class to not win a race during the season.

Results

Formula E

Notes
  – Driver was fastest in group qualifying stage and was given one championship point.
 † – Driver did not finish the race, but was classified as he completed over 90% of the race distance.

Jaguar I-Pace eTrophy

Notes
 † – Driver did not finish the race, but was classified as he completed over 90% of the race distance.

Footnotes

References

External links

 

Chinese auto racing teams
Auto racing teams established in 2016
Formula E teams
2016 establishments in China
Sports teams in Shanghai
Formula E Teams' Champions